Yong In University is a private university located in Samga-dong, Cheoin-gu, Yongin-si, Gyeonggi-do, South Korea. Founded as a judo school, it expanded to the present-day comprehensive private university offering both undergraduate and graduate courses.

History
Yong In University is a private university located in Samga-dong, Choin-gu, Yongin-shi, Kyonggi Province, Korea. The school opened as Korea Judo School in 1953 under the founding slogan of "Be the one who contributes to society through moral cultivation." It was commissioned as a four-year undergraduate school in 1971 and changed its name to Korea Physical Science College to the current name, Yong In University in 1993. Started as a physical education college, it is a private university with total 35 departments for both day and night sessions in the 6 colleges: Martial Art, Physical Science, Culture & Art, Business Administration, Environmental Science and Health & Welfare. Also, the university has established 7 special graduate schools in Education, Physical Science, Art, Business, Rehabilitation & Health Science, Taekwondo, Cultural Asset and one general graduate school with 8 subordinate organizations including the Central Library and 18 affiliate organizations to develop competitive global talents.

Colleges 

 College of Martial Arts
 Dept. of Judo
 Dept. of Judo Instructor Education
 Dept. of Combative Martial Arts Training
 Dept. of Oriental Martial Arts
 Dept. of Taekwondo
 Dept. of Security Service
 Dept. of Military Science
 College of Sports Sciences
 Dept. of Sport & Leisure Studies
Dept. of Physical Education
 Dept. of Golf
 Dept. of Special Physical Education
 College of Arts and Culture
 Dept. of Dance
 Dept. of Media Design
 Dept. of Fine Arts
 Dept. of Theatre
 Dept. of Korean Traditional Music
 Dept. of Film
 Dept. of Cultural Property
 Dept. of Cultural Content
 Dept. of Applied Music
  College of Business and Public Administration
 Dept. of Business Administration
 Dept. of Culture & Tourism
 Dept. of Management Information Systems
 Dept. of Police Administration
 Dept. of Chinese Studies
 Dept. of English
 Dept. of Beauty business
 College of Environmental Sciences
 Dept. of Occupational and Environmental Health
 Dept. of Environmental Science
 Dept. of Computer Science
 Dept. of Logistics Statistics & Information Systems
 Dept. of Life Science
 College of Public Health and Welfare
 Dept. of Food Science and Nutrition
 Dept. of Physical Therapy
 Dept. of Social Welfare

Graduate school

International Exchange Programs
Foreign Language Education Program 
Yong In University has audio video labs and is operating training programs to provide counselling, guidance and person-to-person tutoring by professors.

Study Abroad System
The university runs language programs and holds foreign language contests (English, Chinese, Japanese) every semester hosted by the International Education Institute, providing study abroad opportunities in each semester to awarded students.

Exchange Student Program
Exchange students can choose among English, Japanese and Chinese-speaking countries. They are selected based on their language proficiency and are given chances to study abroad either in March/April for the first semester and September/October in the second semester.

 International Exchange Partners

China
Central University of Finance and Economics
Harbin Normal University
Shandong University
Ji Lin University
Capital Institute of Physical Education
Qiqihar University
Zhejiang University
Hunan Normal University
Zhejiang Gongshang University
Yanbian University
Shenyang Sport University
The Hang Zhou Jiang Nan College
Suqian Zeda Vocational & Technical College
Taiwan
National Taiwan Sport University
Chinese Culture University
Japan
Nihon University
Sendai University
International Budo University
Nagoya University of Arts
Yamaguchi University of Human Welfare and Culture
Australia
Victoria University
Swinburne University of Technology
Holmsglen Institute of TAFE
Malaysia
HELP University

USA
University of California, Berkeley
University of Utah
Mississippi State University
Centenary College
Lewis & Clark College
Smithsonian Institution
California State University, Bakersfield
Professional Golfers Career College
Germany
Cologne University
Russia
Lesgaft Institute of Sports
Canada
The University of British Columbia
Seneca College
The University of Winnipeg
The United Kingdom
University of Portsmouth
Kent Institute of Art and Design
Spain
Universidad Politecnica De Madrid
Poland
Joef Pitsudski University of Physical Education
Philippines
Bulacan State University

Grade/graduation 
 Early graduation

This is a system to confer an undergraduate degree to outstanding students who have acquired credits required for graduation within six to seven semesters.

Credit Exchange with Open Cyber University (OCU)

The student can acquire maximum six credits per semester online.

Credit Exchange Program

Yong In University has an agreement with 26 other universities in Kyonggi-Incheon area to exchange students and to acknowledge credits earned at the partner school.

Professional Teacher Education Program

Students who enroll in the college of education or departments in which teaching course is established/approved can acquire a certificate for secondary school teacher (Level 2).

Campus life 

Research activities

Dissertation presentations and academic events on majors are held by college and department, academic society, circle. Dissertations are published on and off campus journals and relevant lectures are held as well.

University Magazine Publication

The School Paper Editing Committee publishes school paper Danho every year. Information on social issues, dissertation, essay and literature are included. Outstanding works are awarded the Baekho Literature Award every year.

University Festival

This is a festival of academic lectures, presentations, exhibition of illustrated poems, singing contest, broadcast festival,  concerts by circles and scheduled events. School faculty, alumni and campus neighbors participate.

University Sports Festival

This is a festival in which colleges and departments compete against one another in sport.

Auxiliary organizations 
University Library

With Academic Information Support Section and Academic Information Reading Section, Yong In University Central Library comprises 2 five-story buildings (total 7,606 m2).

University Museum

The museum, located within Yong In University campus, accommodates exhibit hall, storages, data rooms, preservation rooms and research rooms of 795 m2. Exhibitions and academic conferences are held in the museum, which is registered as the career certifying institution and the professional institution for the exploration of culture assets and the survey on landmarks.

Office of Athletics

The Directorate was established to provide support to sports talents and the training team.

University Newspaper and Broadcasting Center

The university newspaper is a media body of the university.

The Education Broadcast System was opened on October 23, 1986.

Center for Industry and Academic Cooperation

The committee provides administrative support and assistance in human resource development, R&D, technology transfer through research commissioned and coordination with industrial bodies.

Sports & Wellness Research Center

 Office of Information Management

This provides information dissemination system via high speed wireless network, all-in-one information system, lecture support system, portal system, etc.

Campus

Notable alumni
Jang Ki-yong
Baek Jin-hee
Choi Ji-ho
Gary (Leessang)
Hwang In-young
Hyun Young
Kim Dong-hyun, professional Mixed Martial Artist
Kim Jae-bum 
Kim Sa-rang 
Kyu Ha Kim 
Sung Hoon 
Won Bin 
Yang Dong-geun
Yoon Se-ah
Yong Chin Pak
Lee Jung-hyun (Actor)
Kim Go-eun (Laysha)

References

Yongin
Universities and colleges in Gyeonggi Province
1953 establishments in South Korea
Educational institutions established in 1953